Heart Blanche is the fifth studio album by American recording artist CeeLo Green. The album was released on November 6, 2015, by Atlantic Records.

Critical reception

Heart Blanche received generally mixed reviews from music critics. At Metacritic, which assigns a normalized rating out of 100 to reviews from mainstream critics, the album received an average score of 57 based on 14 reviews, which indicates "mixed or average reviews". Ryan B. Patrick of Exclaim! wrote that "Heart Blanche, while delivering Green's usually masterful take on gospel-influenced and pop-minded R&B, feels listless and lacks passion."

Track listing

Personnel
 CeeLo Green - Primary Artist, Composer, Producer
 Elton John - Composer
 Bernie Taupin - Composer
 Eg White - Bass, Drums, Guitar, Producer, Programming, Synthesizer 
 Mark Ronson - Composer, Producer
 Charlie Puth - Composer, Producer, Programming
 Sean Phelan - Composer, Engineer, Instrumentation, Mixing, Producer, Programming
 Jack Splash - Arranger, Composer, Engineer, Producer
 Manny Marroquin - Mixing
 Jaycen Joshua - Mixing
 Tomas Carrillo - Guitar, Programming
 John Wicks- Composer, Drummer
 Nick Valentin - Assistant Engineer
 Chris Gehringer - Mastering
 Craig Rosen - A&R

Charts

References

2015 albums
Atlantic Records albums
Albums produced by Jon Bellion
CeeLo Green albums
Albums recorded at Electro-Vox Recording Studios